Horatio J. Stow ( in Lowville, Lewis County, New York – February 19, 1859 in Clifton Springs, Ontario County, New York) was an American politician from New York.

Life
He was the son of Congressman Silas Stow (1773–1827) and Mary (Ruggles) Stow. He attended Lowville Academy. Then he studied law with Thomas C. Chittenden in Adams, Jefferson County, New York, was admitted to the bar, and practiced in Buffalo, New York. He married Anna J. Towers, and they had three children.

As a Whig, he was Recorder of Buffalo from 1840 to 1844; and a delegate to the New York State Constitutional Convention of 1846. In 1848, he joined the Free Soil Party. Afterwards he abandoned the practice of law, and engaged in agricultural pursuits in Lewiston, Niagara County, New York.

He was an Independent member of the New York State Senate (29th D.) in 1858 and 1859. He did not take his seat at the beginning of the session in 1859, and died on February 19.

Wisconsin Chief Judge Alexander W. Stow (1805–1854) was his brother; Assemblyman George D. Ruggles was his uncle.

Sources
 The New York Civil List compiled by Franklin Benjamin Hough, Stephen C. Hutchins and Edgar Albert Werner (1867; pg. 391 and 442)
 Biographical Sketches of the State Officers and Members of the Legislature of the State of New York in 1859 by William D. Murray (pg. 99ff)
 Horatio J. Stow at Ancestry.com
 Courts and Lawyers of New York: a History from 1609 to 1925 by Alden Chester & Edwin Melvin Williams (Vol. I; pg. 1266;

1809 births
1859 deaths
New York (state) Whigs
19th-century American politicians
New York (state) Free Soilers
New York (state) state senators
People from Lowville, New York
New York (state) state court judges
Politicians from Buffalo, New York
People from Lewiston, New York
New York (state) Independents
19th-century American judges